Colobothea passerina is a species of beetle in the family Cerambycidae. It was described by Wilhelm Ferdinand Erichson in 1848. It is known from Guyana and French Guiana.

References

passerina
Beetles described in 1848